Mandevilla torosa is a species of plant from Jamaica, which is extending its population towards southern Mexico. It has two varieties called "southern typical variety torosa" and "northern variety coulteri".

References 

torosa
Plants described in 1932
Flora of Jamaica
Flora of Mexico